Randa Jarrar (born 1978) is an American writer and translator. Her first novel, the coming-of-age story A Map of Home (2008), won her the Hopwood Award, and an Arab American Book Award. Since then she has published short stories, essays, the collection, Him, Me, Muhammad Ali (2016), and the memoir, Love Is an Ex-Country (2021).

She teaches creative writing in an MFA program at California State University at Fresno.

Biography 
Randa Jarrar was born in 1978 in Chicago, to an Egyptian mother and a Palestinian father. She grew up in Kuwait and Egypt. After the Gulf War in 1991, she and her family returned to the United States, living in the New York area. Jarrar studied creative writing at Sarah Lawrence College, receiving an MA in Middle Eastern Studies from the University of Texas at Austin, and an MFA in creative writing from the University of Michigan.

She is a creative writing professor at California State University. Of her writing, author and critic Mat Johnson has  said “Randa Jarrar’s prose is bold and luscious and makes the darkly comic seem light."

Writings 

Jarrar has written nonfiction and fiction, publishing her first short story in the prestigious Ploughshares literary journal in Fall 2004. Her short story, "You Are a 14-Year-Old Arab Chick Who First Moved to Texas" was the winner of the first Million Writers Award for online fiction. She has published two Lives columns in The New York Times Magazine, exploring her past as a single mother.

Her first novel came out to critical acclaim in 2008. The Christian Science Monitor wrote: “Randa Jarrar takes all the sappy, beloved clichés about “where you hang your hat” and blows them to smithereens in her energizing, caustically comic debut novel, A Map of Home.”

Her second book, a collection of stories, won A PEN Oakland Award, A Story Prize Spotlight Award, and an American Book Award.

Of her stories, critic Lorraine Ali wrote "Jarrar is hardly the romantic. Love between couples here is often no more than sex, casual and flippant in the new world, or the unwanted consequence of an arranged marriage in the old world. When her characters are in relationships, it's often in the context of a parent or family they never really had a strong bond with in the first place. It might be the resentment-filled space between mothers and daughters, or the disappointment of fathers who are just far enough out of touch to remain a mystery. But when Jarrar's sense of humor tangles with her character's feelings of estrangement, the results are often charming and funny — in a bittersweet sort of way."

In 2021, she published the memoir, Love Is an Ex-Country.

Barbara Bush commentary 
On April 17, 2018, following the death of former first lady Barbara Bush, Jarrar described the former first lady as "a generous and smart and amazing racist who, along with her husband, raised a war criminal. Fuck outta here with your nice words", referring to Bush's son, former President George W. Bush.

She said she felt compelled to speak “because I want people to remember history. I want people to know that our country’s actions don’t just disappear; they have real, negative consequences,” she said in an email. “If we want a better future, we have to confront our past.” Jarrar elaborated on her criticism of the former First Lady, citing the Bush family legacy in Iraq and Barbara's comments about Anita Hill (whose claims she doubted) and Katrina victims (she once said evacuees were “underprivileged anyway” and better off in the Astrodome). “The Bush family — including Barbara Bush — supported policies that harmed and destroyed the lives of millions,” she said.

Jarrar was sharply criticized for her remarks, and demands were made that she be terminated from her job. In response to this, she tweeted that she will "never be fired" for her words, because she has tenure at California State University at Fresno.  California State University at Fresno president Joseph Castro responded to widespread public outrage, saying "Professor Jarrar’s expressed personal views and commentary are obviously contrary to the core values of our University, which include respect and empathy for individuals with divergent points of view". Fresno State confirmed that she was on leave from the university at the time the controversial comments were made.  At a news conference, university provost Lynnette Zelezny confirmed that Jarrar's tenure would not protect her from termination, but did not specify whether termination was appropriate at the time. On April 25, 2018, News Metropolis reported that a Change.org petition to remove Jarrar from her position at Fresno State University had received over 90,000 signatures.  The ACLU of Northern California, PEN America, The Thomas Jefferson Center for Freedom of Expression, The Electronic Frontier Foundation, and others sent letters in support of Jarrar.

During the controversy, Jarrar provided a telephone number on her Twitter account as if it was her own contact number, stating "If you really wanna reach me, here's my number ok?" The phone number that she provided was that of an emergency suicide/crisis hotline at Arizona State University. ASU said that they did not believe anyone who needed to get through was unable to.

Comments on diversity and cultural appropriation 
Jarrar wrote an opinion piece called "Why I Can't Stand White Belly-Dancers", published in Salon in 2014. In this piece, Jarrar said she felt that white women who take part in the art of bellydance are engaging in cultural appropriation and "brown face."

Her commentary was widely criticized; UCLA law professor Eugene Volokh stated, "Maybe telling people that they can’t work in some field because they have the wrong color or ancestry would be ... rats, I don’t know what to call it. If only there were an adjective that could be used to mean 'telling people that they mustn’t do something, because of their race or ethnic origin'". Atlantic writer Conor Friedersdorf offered: "[W]ith regional variations, something like Raqs Sharqi seems to have been known throughout the Mediterranean and certainly flourished in Egypt and the Eastern Mediterranean before the arrival of the Arabs in the 7th century".

Novelist and comics writer G. Willow Wilson wrote in defense of Jarrar, "When you shimmy around a stage in a hip band and call yourself Aliya Selim and receive praise and encouragement, while the real Aliya Selims are shortening their names to Ally and wondering if their accent is too strong to land that job interview, if the boss will look askance at their headscarf, if the kids at school are going to make fun of their children, guess what: you are exercising considerable privilege." In response to these criticisms, Jarrar wrote a follow-up to her piece, titled "I Still Can't Stand White Bellydancers".

On July 27, 2018, Jarrar tweeted, "At some point, all of us in the literary community must DEMAND that white editors resign. It’s time to STEP DOWN and hand over the positions of power. We don’t have to wait for them to fuck up. The fact that they hold these positions is fuck up enough." This was in response to the publication in The Nation of a poem that made what some commentators perceived as racist attempts at black vernacular, which sparked a backlash, and which the editors later apologized for publishing.

Personal life 
Jarrar has written about her experiences with domestic violence and reproductive coercion.  She is openly queer.

Awards 
 2004 Million Writers Award for best short story online
 2007 Hopwood Award for Best Novel
 2009 Arab American Book Award
 2016 Story Prize Spotlight Award
 2017 American Book Award
 2017 PEN Oakland Josephine Miles Award
2020 Creative Capital Award

Bibliography 
 A Map of Home: A Novel Hardcover: Other Press 2008. .
 A Map of Home: A Novel Paperback: Penguin 2009. .
 Him, Me, Muhammad Ali Paperback: Sarabande Books 2016. 
Love Is an Ex-Country Hardcover: Catapult 2021. ISBN 9781948226585
Anthologies
 Words Without Borders: The World Through the Eyes of Writers, Alane Salierno Mason, Dedi Felman, Samantha Schnee (eds), Anchor Books, March 2007, 
 Beirut39 Bloomsbury 2010
 Watchlist: 32 short stories by persons of interest O/R Books 2016 

Translation
 The Year Of The Revolutionary New Bread-making Machine by Hassan Daoud, 2007. , Published by Telegram, Paperback

References

External links 
 Author's website

1978 births
Living people
21st-century American novelists
21st-century American short story writers
21st-century American women writers
21st-century American translators
American Book Award winners
American people of Egyptian descent
American women novelists
American women short story writers
American writers of Palestinian descent
Novelists from Illinois
Sarah Lawrence College alumni
University of Michigan alumni
Writers from Chicago
Queer writers
American LGBT writers